The Miami Student is the official student-published newspaper at Miami University in Oxford, Ohio, published weekly every Tuesday during the academic year. It claims to be the oldest university newspaper in the United States, claiming it was established in 1826.  However, 1826 is the date of the establishment of Miami's first student-run periodical, The Literary Focus. The Miami Student itself began publication on May 8, 1867.

Starting in January 2017, the frequency of publication was reduced from twice a week (every Tuesday and Friday) to once a week.

Awards
In 2018, the newspaper received several awards from the Society of Professional Journalists.
 Feature Writing (Large) 10,000+ Students - FSB professor wants to "be everything" by Audrey Davis
 General Column Writing (Large) 10,000+ Students - Speaking up about mental health is key; Jodie Sweetin hits the mark with talk on addiction; 'Jim and Andy' and learning to live with your worst inner critic by Devon Shuman
 Online News Reporting - A story of addiction and recovery by Laura Fitzgerald

References

External links
 The Miami Student online version
 Online archive of issues of the Student, 1867–present
 The Miami Student on issuu

Miami University 
Newspapers established in 1867
Student newspapers published in Ohio
1867 establishments in Ohio